is a 2003 action game developed and released by Asmik Ace Entertainment exclusively in Japan for the GameCube on April 10, 2003. A PlayStation 2 version was released on July 8, 2004.

References 

2003 video games
Action video games
Asmik Ace Entertainment games
DX
GameCube games
Japan-exclusive video games
PlayStation 2 games
Multiplayer and single-player video games
Video games developed in Japan

ja:ドカポンシリーズ